Empress Ula Nara may refer to:

Lady Abahai (1590–1626), consort of Nurhaci of the Later Jin dynasty
Empress Xiaojingxian (1681–1731), wife of the Yongzheng Emperor

See also
Empress Nara
Empress Yehe Nara (disambiguation)